This is a list of notable people who are from Guelph, Ontario, or have spent a large part or formative part of their career in that city.

A
 Rick Allain, former ice hockey coach
 Chad Archibald, producer
 Edward Robert Armstrong, engineer
 Ron Asselstine, NHL linesman
 Annie Damer, public health nurse

B
 Carroll Baker
 Baracuda, rapper
 Kimberly Barber, vocal pedagogue
 Shaun Benson, actor
 Lois Betteridge, silversmith
 Katherine Bobak, skater
 Ralph Bowen, musician, educator
 Jeffry Hall Brock, businessman
 Alison Brooks, architect

C
 Neve Campbell, actress
 Dom Cardillo, politician
 Dick Carroll, ice hockey coach
 Miranda Chartrand and Adam Nichols, musical duo
 Lionel Herbert Clarke, businessman and politician
 Jim Cockman, baseball player
 Thomas Christopher Collins, cardinal of the Catholic Church
 Bunk Congalton, baseball player
 Logan Couture, hockey player
 Arthur W. Cutten, businessman
 David Card, Nobel prize winning economist

D
 Noah Danby, actor
 Ken Danby, painter
 Victor Davis, Olympic swimmer
 Brian Dickinson, pianist
 Crawford Douglas, politician

E
 Bob Emslie, baseball player

F
 Rick Ferraro, former politician
 Albert Fish, politician
 Derek Fletcher, former politician
 Charley Fox, former Flight Lieutenant in the Royal Canadian Air Force
 Karen Fralich, world sand sculpting champion
 J.M. Frey, novelist

G

 Gregory Gallant
 Beth Goobie, poet
 Jim Guthrie, singer-songwriter
 James Gordon, singer-songwriter

H
 Micheal Haley, ice hockey player 
 Esther Hill, architect
 Albert_Hughes_, ice hockey player

J
 Clifford Jackman, lawyer and writer
 Aurora James, creative director, activist, and fashion designer
 Edward Johnson, tenor
 Paddy Johnson, art critic

K
 Zoë Keating, cellist
 Donnie Keshawarz, actor
 Thomas King, novelist
 Tim Kingsbury, musician
 Charles Kingsmill, former first director of the Department of the Naval Service of Canada
 Luke Kirby, actor
 Henry Kock, horticulturalist

L
 Gary Leadston, politician
 Laura Lemon, composer
 Andrea Lindsay, singer-songwriter
 Jean Little, writer
 Livestock, rapper
 Douglas Lochhead, poet
 Lloyd Longfield, politician
 Lucy, Lady Duff-Gordon, fashion designer
 David Lush, politician

M
 John Kenneth Macalister, World War II personnel
 Andrew Paul MacDonald, composer
 Dan MacKenzie, sports administrator and marketing executive
 Dorothy Maclean, writer and educator
 Brian MacLellan, GM of 2018 Stanley Cup Champion Washington Capitals
 Earl MacNaughton, founding dean of the College of Physics at the University of Guelph
 William Austin Mahoney, architect
 Des McAnuff, artistic director
 David Ross McCord, lawyer
 John McCrae, soldier, poet and physician
 Ambre McLean, singer-songwriter
 Miranda Mulholland, fiddle player and singer
 Robert Munsch, author
 Brendan Myers, philosopher
 George McPhee, 2018 NHL MVP of Year
 Jean Mills, children's author

N
 Joe Neilands, biochemist
 Noah23, hip hop artist
 Craig Norris, rock singer

O
 Kady O'Malley, journalist
 Jenny Omnichord, musician
 George Turner Orton, politician

P
 Arthur Palmer, scholar
 Gregory Pepper, musician
 Joseph Petric, accordionist
 Alexander Fraser Pirie, journalist
 Brad Pirie, former ice hockey player
 George Pirie, newspaper publisher
 Zachary Pollari, football player

R
 Mark Radoja, Professional poker player
 Jus Reign, Youtuber
 Tommy Reilly, harmonica player
 Sue Richards, artist
 Kelly Richardson, artist
 Aaron Riches, sing/songwriter
 Doug Risebrough, hockey player
 Thomas F. Ryan, sportsman and entrepreneur

S
 Sandra Sabatini, writer
 Liz Sandals, politician
 Joe Sawyer, actor
 Ray Scapinello, linesman
 Henry Scholfield, politician
 James Schroder, politician
 Andrea Seccafien, Olympic athlete
 Surendra Seeraj, cricket player
 Seth, cartoonist
 T. Sher Singh, lawyer
 Joey Slinger, journalist and author
 Gavin Smith, poker player
 John Snobelen, former politician
 Dave Somerville, singer
 J. Dewey Soper, ornithologist
 Ned Sparks, actor
 Doug Stinson, mathematician
 David Stirton, politician
 Donna Strickland, Nobel Prize winner
 Mary Swan, novelist

T
 Janis Tarchuk, politician
 Chuck Tatham, screenwriter
 Percy A. Taverner, ornithologist

V
 Frank Valeriote, politician
 Reg Vermue, musician

W
 Charles Wilson, composer
 Robert Wickens, race car driver
 Corey Wood, musician
 Joshua Workman, political consultant

References

 
Guelph
Guelph